Ljubež v Lazih is a small settlement in the Municipality of Litija in central Slovenia. It lies just off the road from Litija to Gabrovka. The area is part of the traditional region of Lower Carniola. It is now included with the rest of the municipality in the Central Sava Statistical Region.

References

External links

Ljubež v Lazih on Geopedia

Populated places in the Municipality of Litija